Belmont und Constanze, oder Die Entführung aus dem Serail (English: Belmonte and Konstanze, The Abduction from the Seraglio) by Christoph Friedrich Bretzner is a libretto, published in 1781, telling the story of the hero Belmonte, assisted by his servant Pedrillo, attempting to rescue his beloved Konstanze from the seraglio of the Pasha Selim. First set to music by Johann André and performed as a singspiel in Berlin in 1781, it became famous as the story on which Wolfgang Amadeus Mozart based his opera Die Entführung aus dem Serail (Abduction from the Seraglio).

See also 
 Seraglio

References 

1781 compositions
German fiction
Opera libretti
18th-century German literature
Die Entführung aus dem Serail